Hammouda (in Arabic حمودة) or Hamouda or Hammuda is a given name derived of Hammoud and variants Hamoud and Hamud. It is also a common surname in Arabic. Notable people with the name include:

Hammouda
Adel Hammouda (born 1948), Egyptian journalist
Hammouda Pacha Bey, (died 1666), second Bey of Tunis of the Mouradite dynasty reigning from 1631 until his death

Hamouda
Hamouda Ahmed El Bashir, Sudanese footballer
Amirouche Aït Hamouda (1926-1959), commonly called Colonel Amirouche, a leader in the Algerian War, organizing the maquis of the Wilaya III and considered a national hero in Algeria
Attia Hamouda (born 1914), Egyptian weightlifter
Nabil Hamouda (born 1983), Algerian footballer
Nassima Ben Hamouda (born 1973), Algerian volleyball player

Hammuda
Hammuda ibn Ali (1759–1814) leader of the Husainid Dynasty and the ruler of Tunisia from 1782 until his death
Yahya Hammuda (1908-2006), Chairman of the Palestine Liberation Organization (PLO) Executive Committee from (1967-1969) following the resignation of Ahmad Shukeiri and a predecessor of chairman Yasser Arafat

See also
Hammouda Pacha Mosque, a mosque in Tunis, Tunisia